Trochosa hungarica is a wolf spider species in the genus Trochosa found in Hungary.

See also 
 List of Lycosidae species

References

External links 

Lycosidae
Spiders of Europe
Spiders described in 1879